Rodopoli (meaning "City of Roses", before 1981: Μπάλα - Bala) is a suburban town in Athens, East Attica regional unit, Greece. Since the 2011 local government reform it is part of the municipality Dionysos, of which it is a municipal unit. The municipal unit has an area of 9.550 km2.

Geography

Rodopoli is situated in the hills in the northeastern part of the Athens conurbation, at about 400 m elevation. It lies at the northwestern foot of the Penteliko Mountain. It is 1 km south of Stamata, 2 km north of Dionysos and 19 km northeast of Athens city centre. Its built-up area is continuous with those of the neighbouring towns Drosia and Dionysos. Part of Rodopoli has retained its old village character, while its eastern (and higher elevation) part has seen the development of higher quality residential properties.

Historical population

See also
List of municipalities of Attica

References

Dionysos, Greece
Populated places in East Attica